Shahidabad Rural District is a rural district (dehestan) in Bandpey-ye Gharbi District, Babol County, Mazandaran Province, Iran. At the 2006 census, its population was 10,879, in 2,951 families. The rural district has 13 villages.

References 

Rural Districts of Mazandaran Province
Babol County